Wanessa Camargo is the debut album by Brazilian singer Wanessa Camargo, released on November 15, 2000. The album sold about 250,000 copies in Brazil, and was certified gold by Associação Brasileira dos Produtores de Discos (ABPD). Originally the album had 15 tracks. Later, it was re-released with a new version for the song "Apaixonada Por Você" (meaning in English: "In love with you"), which was used for the Brazilian soap opera Um Anjo Caiu do Céu (meaning in English: "An angel fell from the sky"). Album includes the big hit "O Amor Não Deixa" (in English: Love Won't Let Me).

Production
The album brings compositions of well-known figures of the Brazilian music, like Fernanda Takai, Patrícia Coelho and one of the own Wanessa. The original version of the album contained only 15 songs. When Wanessa was invited to take part in the soundtrack of the novel Um Anjo Caiu do Céu, the song "Apaixonada Por Você", originally a dance pop, was re-recorded as a romantic ballad and with significant changes from the original version. Thus, the CD was later re-released, bringing the new version of "Apaixonada Por Você" as the second bonus track of the album.

Track listing

Certifications

References

2000 debut albums
Wanessa Camargo albums
Portuguese-language albums